Song, by Toad is an independent record label and music blog based in Edinburgh, Scotland. It was founded in 2008 by Matthew Young, and has released a number of critically acclaimed albums by acts including Meursault, Rob St John and Sparrow and the Workshop. The label takes its name from a passage in The Wind in the Willows.

History
Song, by Toad began in 2004 as a music blog by Matthew Young, a design engineer in Edinburgh. The label was founded in 2008 after a drunken discussion with the band Broken Records, whereby Young promised to release the band's first album if they weren't signed by another record label. Although Broken Records eventually signed to 4AD, Young decided to found the label anyway.

Following low key releases by Uhersky Brod and Nightjar, the label's first major release was Pissing on Bonfires/Kissing with Tongues by the Edinburgh-based Meursault in 2009, the success of which Young credits with forcing him 'to set up a proper record label'. The album was rated by cultural magazine The Skinny as the 16th best Scottish album of the 2000-2010 decade.

Toad Sessions
Alongside the record label and the blog, Song, by Toad have also recorded and published a number of live 'Toad Sessions', mostly recorded in Matthew Young's home. The Toad sessions have featured international artists including Mumford & Sons, Josh T. Pearson, Sam Amidon and Lach, as well as artists from the label including Meursault, Adam Stafford and Rob St John.

Artists
These artist have all released music on the Song, by Toad label.

Adam Stafford
Animal Magic Tricks
Bastard Mountain
Dana Gavanski
David Thomas Broughton
Dolfinz
DTHPDL
Dune Witch Trails
eagleowl
Ian Humberstone
Inspector Tapehead
Jesus H Foxx
Jonnie Common
King Creosote
King Post Kitsch
Le Thug
Lil Daggers
Loch Lomond
Magic Eye
Maxwell Panther
Meursault
NAKED
Nightjar
PAWS
Plastic Animals
Rob St John
Sex Hands
Siobhan Wilson
Sparrow and the Workshop
The Builders and the Butchers
The Japanese War Effort
The Leg
The Savings and Loan
The Underground Youth
Trips and Falls
Uhersky Brod
Virgin of the Birds
Waiters
Woodpigeon
Yusuf Azak
Zed Penguin

References

External links
 Song, by Toad Blog 
 Song, by Toad Records
 Toad Sessions

British independent record labels
Record labels established in 2008